The 1961 Brussels Grand Prix was a motor race set to Formula One rules, held on 9 April 1961 at Heysel Park, Belgium. The race was run in three "heats" of 22 laps each and the times were aggregated. The race was won by Australian driver Jack Brabham in a Cooper T53.

Results

Notes
 Maurice Trintignant had previously entered as the No. 40 Cooper-Climax car, but withdrew.
 Wolfgang von Trips and Mauro Bianchi had also entered, but did not participate.
 Jo Schlesser made his debut in this race.
 Although performing extremely well in the practice and qualifying sessions, Jack Lewis was not admitted to the race, since he had failed to be on the Belgian organizers' list of fame.
 Equipe Nationale Belge had entered two modified Emeryson chassis fitted with the heavy Maserati engine for Olivier Gendebien and Lucien Bianchi, and a standard one with the Coventry Climax engine, for Willy Mairesse.

References

Brussels Grand Prix